Eua Motua is a district of Eua division, Tonga. The population is 2,771.

References 

Eua